Bansharaj Sun (born 20 February 1985) is an Indian professional footballer who plays as a forward for Rangdajied United F.C. in the I-League.

Career
Sun made his professional debut for Rangdajied United F.C. in the I-League on 22 September 2013 against Prayag United S.C. at the Salt Lake Stadium in which he came off the bench in the 64th minute for Edmar Figueira as Rangdajied United lost the match 0–2.

Career statistics

References

1985 births
Living people
Footballers from Meghalaya
Indian footballers
Rangdajied United F.C. players
Association football forwards
I-League players